Pengze County is a county in the north of Jiangxi Province, situated on the southeast (right) bank of the Yangtze. The northernmost county-level division of the province, it is under the administration of the prefecture-level city of Jiujiang.

Pengze county has a long history of written record. This county firstly established in the sixth year of Emperor Gaozu, Western Han dynasty (201 BCE)

Administrative divisions
Pengze County has 10 towns and 3 townships.
10 towns

3 townships
 Taipingguan
 Huangling
 Haoshan

Transport
Pengze is served by Pengze railway station on the Tongling–Jiujiang railway.

Climate

References

External links
Official website of Pengze County Government

County-level divisions of Jiangxi
Jiujiang